The Europe Cup 1954 was the fifth Rugby Union European championship, organised by FIRA and the second (and last) with this name.

With the exception of a preliminary, all the matches were played in Italy. As in the 1952 edition, France won the title after a victory over Italy in the final.

This was the last edition of this competition. A European tournament arranged by FIRA, returned only in 1965 with the Nations Cup.

Results

First preliminary

Second preliminary

Semifinals

Final 
After an Italian try in the first minute, France took control of the match and won.

Bibliography 
 Francesco Volpe, Valerio Vecchiarelli (2000), 2000 Italia in Meta, Storia della nazionale italiana di rugby dagli albori al Sei Nazioni, GS Editore (2000) 
 Francesco Volpe, Paolo Pacitti (Author), Rugby 2000, GTE Gruppo Editorale (1999).

References

External links
1954 Rugby Union European Cup at ESPN

1954
1954 rugby union tournaments for national teams
1953–54 in French rugby union
rugby union
rugby union
rugby union
rugby union
rugby union
International rugby union competitions hosted by Italy